Julius Raith (March 29, 1819 – April 11, 1862) was a German-American military officer who served in the American Civil War and the Mexican–American War. He was mortally wounded at the Battle of Shiloh.

Born in Göttingen, Hanover, Raith came to the United States in 1836 with his family, settling in St. Clair County, Illinois. During the Mexican–American War, he led a company of 2nd Illinois Volunteers.  When the Civil War broke out, he helped Gustave Koerner organize a German regiment.

During the Battle of Shiloh, he led a brigade in General McClernand's division composed of his own regiment, the 43rd Illinois along with the 17th Illinois, the 29th Illinois, and the 49th Illinois. The actual commanding officer was Colonel Leonard Fulton Ross, who was absent, leaving Colonel James S. Reardon in charge; however, Reardon was ill. Raith was wounded by a minie ball in the leg above the knee and laid on the battlefield for 24 hours. He died of tetanus from his injuries.

References

See also
 Latin Settlement
 German Americans in the Civil War
 Battle of Shiloh

1819 births
1862 deaths
People of Illinois in the American Civil War
Hanoverian emigrants to the United States
Union Army colonels
United States Army officers
American military personnel of the Mexican–American War
Union military personnel killed in the American Civil War
Deaths from tetanus